In the Book of Genesis, Hul ( Ḥūl) is the son of Aram, son of Shem, who is mentioned twice in the Tanakh, both times in genealogical tables. According to the 1st century Jewish historian Flavius Josephus, he founded Armenia. Because his father is Aram, the eponymous ancestor of the Arameans (sometimes also called Syrians), the Holman Bible Dictionary infers that he must have been included in the Table of Nations as "the original ancestor of an Aramean or Syrian tribe."

Australian Chinese revolutionary Tse Tsan-Tai identifies his descendants with the Austroasiatic peoples and Austronesians.

References

Book of Genesis people
Noach (parashah)